The Citroën Xsara Picasso is a car produced by Citroën from 1999 to 2012. It has a five-seater five-door compact MPV design.

Trim range 
At the time of its release, two trim levels were available, LX and SX. Later designations were 'Desire', 'VTX', and the range topping 'Exclusive' trim level, some with an electric glass sunroof. On all models, the front seat backs have fold down tables, and the rear seats can be removed to create extensive internal space for transportation of bulky items similar to a small van.

2004 facelift 
The model received a facelift in early 2004 with updated bumpers, engines and body-coloured bumpers were made standard on all trim levels.

Engines
The Xsara Picasso was available with a 1.6, 1.8 and 2.0-litre (automatic only) petrol engine, or a 2.0-litre (replaced by the 1.6-litre 2004 onwards) diesel engine, all shared with the smaller Citroën Xsara.

Sales and production
On 22 March 2007, Auto Trader reviewed the Xsara Picasso, calling it the most popular MPV in the United Kingdom, "thanks to a combination of practicality and affordability". From 1999 to 2010, the Xsara Picasso has been assembled at PSA plant in Vigo, Spain.

South America

Since 2001, the Xsara Picasso was produced in Porto Real, Brazil for the market in Latin America, where it was the top selling vehicle in its class for a while. 

In December 2002, Citroën do Brasil launched a limited edition called Xsara Picasso Etoile, celebrating the victory of Lula from the PT at the 2002 Brazilian presidential election.

The model was restyled again in 2007 in China and South America, with the grille adopting wide chrome bars.

Name
The Picasso name was licensed from the family of Pablo Picasso, which created significant international publicity at the time of the car's launch, as not all the Picasso family were happy with the association of the artist's name with a car, when his granddaughter Marina attempted to sue her uncle Claude in April 1999.

Pablo Picasso was originally associated with Citroën in the 1960s when he painted a Citroën DS with "The wreaths of Peace".

References

External links

Xsara Picasso
Euro NCAP small MPVs
Compact MPVs
Cars introduced in 1999
2000s cars
2010s cars
Front-wheel-drive vehicles
Cars of Brazil